The 2017–18 Boston University Terriers men's basketball team represented Boston University during the 2017–18 NCAA Division I men's basketball season. The Terriers, led by seventh-year head coach Joe Jones, played their home games at Case Gym as members of the Patriot League. They finished the season 15–16, 10–8 in Patriot League play to finish in fifth place. In the Patriot League tournament, they defeated Lehigh in the quarterfinals before losing to Bucknell in the semifinals.

Previous season
The Terriers finished the 2016–17 season 18–14, 12–6 in Patriot League play to finish in a tie for second place. As the No. 2 seed in the Patriot League tournament, they defeated Loyola (MD) in the quarterfinals before losing to Lehigh in double overtime in the semifinals.

Offseason

2017 recruiting class

Roster

Schedule and results

|-
!colspan=9 style=| Exhibition

|-
!colspan=9 style=| Non-conference regular season

|-
!colspan=9 style=| Patriot League regular season

|-
!colspan=9 style=| Patriot League tournament

References

Boston University Terriers men's basketball seasons
Boston University
Boston
Boston